Algernon may refer to:

 Algernon (name), a given name (includes a list of people and characters with the name)
 Algernon Township, Custer County, Nebraska

See also
 Treaty of Algeron, an agreement signed by the United Federation of Planets and the Romulan Star Empire in Star Trek
 "Flowers for Algernon", a science fiction short story and subsequent novel written by Daniel Keyes
 United States v. Algernon Blair, Inc, a 1973 American lawsuit regarding its breach of contract with a subcontractor
 Růže pro Algernon, Aleš Brichta album